Mumia most commonly refers to Mumia Abu-Jamal (born 1954), imprisoned political activist known for his conviction in the murder of Daniel Faulkner.

Mumia may also refer to:
Mummia, either a substance used in the embalming of mummies, or a powder made from ground mummies
Nabongo Mumia (c.1852–1949), leader of the Wanga Kingdom of Kenya
Mumia (bacterium), a genus of bacteria

See also
Mumias, a town in Kakamega County, Kenya